Group B of the 2009 Fed Cup Europe/Africa Zone Group III was one of two pools in Group III of the Europe/Africa zone of the 2009 Fed Cup. Five teams competed in a round robin competition, with the top team advanced to Group II for 2010.

Norway vs. Liechtenstein

Egypt vs. Iceland

Armenia vs. Moldova

Norway vs. Iceland

Egypt vs. Moldova

Armenia vs. Liechtenstein

Norway vs. Armenia

Egypt vs. Liechtenstein

Iceland vs. Moldova

Norway vs. Moldova

Egypt vs. Iceland

Liechtenstein vs. Iceland

Norway vs. Egypt

Armenia vs. Iceland

Liechtenstein vs. Moldova

  placed first in this group and thus advanced to Group II for 2010, where they placed last in their pool of four, but fifth overall due to their victory in the relegation play-off.

See also
Fed Cup structure

References

External links
 Fed Cup website

2009 Fed Cup Europe/Africa Zone